Muhammad Ijaz-ul-Haq (born 20 February 1952) is a Pakistani politician and the former leader of the Pakistan Muslim League (Z). He served as Minister for Religious Affairs and Minorities in the government of General Pervez Musharraf from 2004 to 2007, after having served as Minister for Labour, Manpower and Overseas Pakistanis in the government of Nawaz Sharif from 1990 to 1993.

A graduate of Southern Illinois University, Ijaz worked as a banker prior to entering in politics in 1988, following the assassination of his father General Zia-ul-Haq, Pakistan's sixth president. He was a member of the National Assembly of Pakistan from November 1990 to October 1993, from November 2002 to November 2007, and from June 2013 to May 2018. He is mostly active during dictatorial regimes in Pakistan.

Early life and education 
Ijaz was born on 20 February 1952 to General Zia-ul-Haq, who was born in Jalandhar, and Begum Shafiq Zia, who was born in Uganda.

He received his master's degree in business administration from Southern Illinois University, United States. He worked as a banker, with Bank of America in Bahrain, prior to entering politics in 1990.

Political career 
Upon the death of his father in a plane crash in 1988, Haq returned to Pakistan and entered politics.

Ijaz was elected to the National Assembly of Pakistan for the first time in the 1990 Pakistani general election from NA-39 Rawalpindi-IV and NA-72 Toba Tek Singh-II as a candidate of the Islami Jamhoori Ittehad (IJI), defeating the Pakistan Democratic Alliance (PDA) candidates. The elections were declared manipulated and rigged by the Supreme Court of Pakistan in 2012.

Ijaz was re-elected to the National Assembly of Pakistan for the second time in the 1993 Pakistani general election from NA-54 Rawalpindi-IV as a candidate of the Pakistan Muslim League (N) (PML(N)), defeating the Pakistan People's Party (PPP) candidate.

In 1994, he was imprisoned with other PML(N) leaders in Adiala Jail.

Ijaz was re-elected to the National Assembly of Pakistan for the third time in the 1997 Pakistani general election from NA-54 Rawalpindi-IV as a candidate of the PML(N), defeating the PPP candidate. Following the election, he was appointed as the Federal Minister for Labour, Manpower and Overseas Pakistanis where he served from 1997 to 1999 during Nawaz Sharif's second ministry until the Sharif government was overthrown soon afterward in the 1999 Pakistani coup d'état by General Pervez Musharraf.

Following differences with Nawaz Sharif, Ijaz created his own party, the Pakistan Muslim League (Z) (PML(Z)) in 2002.

He was re-elected to the National Assembly of Pakistan for the fourth time in the 2002 Pakistani general election from NA-191 Bahawalnagar-IV as a candidate of the PML(Z), defeating the PPP candidate.

He allied with the Pakistan Muslim League (Q) (PML(Q)) and was appointed as the Federal Minister for Religious Affairs and Federal Minister for Minorities.

He ran in the 2008 Pakistani general election from NA-191 Bahawalnagar-IV as a candidate of the PML(Q) but lost the seat to a PPP candidate. Following the defeat in the elections, he resigned from the PML(Q) in 2008. 

In 2012, it was reported that he may join the PML(N) and get their ticket to run in the upcoming general elections from NA-191 Bahawalnagar-IV. In 2013, he allied with, but didn’t join, the PML(N).

Ijaz ran for two seats in the National Assembly in the 2013 Pakistani general election. He lost from NA-190 Bahawalnagar-III, losing to a PML(N) candidate, and won NA-191 Bahahwalnagar-IV, defeating a PML(N) candidate.

He ran from NA-169 Bahawalnagar-IV in the 2018 Pakistani general election, but lost to Noorul Hassan Tanvir, a PML(N) candidate. Ijaz received 72,461 votes. 

On 19 March 2023, Ijaz merged the PML(Z) into the Pakistan Tehreek-e-Insaf (PTI) after a meeting with Imran Khan, the former Prime Minister, and the chairman of the PTI. He further said that he would contest the next general elections on a PTI ticket.

Further reading

References

Living people
1952 births
Pakistani bankers
Pakistani political party founders
Pakistani MNAs 1990–1993
Pakistani MNAs 1993–1996
Pakistani MNAs 1997–1999
Pakistani MNAs 2002–2007
Punjab MPAs 2008–2013
Pakistani MNAs 2013–2018
Southern Illinois University Carbondale alumni
Children of presidents of Pakistan
Religious Ministers of Pakistan
Pakistan Muslim League (N) MNAs
Pakistani prisoners and detainees
Pakistani Muslims
Pakistani expatriates in Bahrain